Prince Christian of Denmark and Norway (25 March 1675 – 27 June 1695) was the third son of Christian V of Denmark and his consort, Charlotte Amalie of Hesse-Kassel, and thus a younger brother of King Frederick IV. He died aged 20, and never married.

Background

At the age of 12 he was mentioned as a possible royal subject for Poland's throne. As a 14-year-old was in charge of the celebrations on the occasion of his father's birthday that brought probably the first opera in Denmark, which ended with Amalienborg fire in 1689. Described as a strong and lively young man he took up his first major trip to Italy in May 1695, soon after he got infected by smallpox and died 27 June in Ulm. The body was taken to Roskilde, where interment took place 11 September of that year.

Ancestry

References

Danish princes
1675 births
1695 deaths
Danish Lutherans
Infectious disease deaths in Denmark
Deaths from smallpox
Children of Christian V of Denmark
Burials at Roskilde Cathedral
Sons of kings